Mandela Kapere (died 12 July 2020) was an Namibian politician and Former Member of Parliament of the Parliament of Namibia from 2019 until his death in July 2020.

Biography
He was a Member of the National Assembly of Namibia from 2020 to 2021. Kapere died from COVID-19 at age 38.

References

1980s births
2020 deaths
Members of the National Assembly (Namibia)
Deaths from the COVID-19 pandemic in Namibia